Hausen (Wied) is a municipality and a spa town in the district of Neuwied, in Rhineland-Palatinate, Germany.

References

Neuwied (district)